George Boniface Taguluvala Simbachawene (born 5 July 1968) is a Tanzanian CCM politician and Member of Parliament for Kibakwe constituency since 2005.

He held the post of the Minister of State in the President’s Office responsible for Regional Administration, Local Government, Civil Service and Good Governance from November 2015 to September 2017. He resigned from his post on September 7, 2017 after his name was implicated in the Minerals report from his time in the Ministry of Energy and Minerals.

On 21 July 2019, he is assigned as the Minister of State in the Vice President's Office. On January 23, 2020 he was appointed as the Minister of Home Affairs. On 10 January 2022 he was sworn in as the new Minister for Legal and Constitutional Affairs.

References

1968 births
Living people
Chama Cha Mapinduzi MPs
Tanzanian MPs 2005–2010
Tanzanian MPs 2010–2015
Tanzanian MPs 2015–2020
Tanzanian MPs 2020–2025
Deputy government ministers of Tanzania
Open University of Tanzania alumni
Tanzanian Roman Catholics